Eremein (6 November 2001 – 8 March 2020) was a notable Australian Thoroughbred racehorse. He was a chestnut gelding foaled in 2001 and bred by Bhima Stud in New South Wales. Eremein was by Timber Country (USA) from Marrego (won $78,520) by Marscay.

His best wins were the Rosehill Guineas and the Australian Derby in 2005, and the Ranvet Stakes, BMW and AJC Queen Elizabeth Stakes in 2006.  Injuries and the equine influenza outbreak affected his chances to prove himself as one of the best Australian Thoroughbreds of recent years.

He had 27 starts for 12 wins, 7 seconds and 2 thirds for A$4,260,445 in prize money.

References

External links
 Eremein's racing record

2001 racehorse births
Thoroughbred family 1-i
Racehorses bred in Australia
Racehorses trained in Australia
2020 racehorse deaths